"Keep Fishin'" is a song by the American alternative rock band Weezer. It is the second single from the band's fourth album, Maladroit.

Reception
Melissa Bobbitt at About.com ranked "Keep Fishin'" as the 13th best Weezer song, where she comments "Rivers Cuomo has always had an affinity for the paranoid in his lyrics".  It was named as one of the 12 best post-Pinkerton Weezer songs by The A.V. Club, where they state "It's the kind of infectious, impeccably crafted power-pop rocker Cuomo can probably bang out in his sleep".

Commercially, the song peaked at #15 on the US Billboard Hot Modern Rock Tracks chart. The song also reached #24 on the Triple J Hottest 100 in 2002.

Music video
The music video, directed by Marcos Siega, features Weezer as guests on The Muppet Show (with drummer Patrick Wilson being held captive by Miss Piggy at the beginning). As noted in the Weezer Video Capture Device DVD, it marks the acting debut for the band members in a music video. At one point, Kevin Smith was attached to direct the video for this song, but without the Muppets.

Track listing
Radio Only Promo CD
"Keep Fishin'" (Radio Version)
"Keep Fishin'" (Album Version)

US Retail CD
"Keep Fishin'" (Radio Version)
"Keep Fishin'" (Franklin Mint Version)

UK Retail CD #1
"Keep Fishin'" (Radio Version)
"Photograph" (Live)
"Death and Destruction" (Live)
"Keep Fishin'"  (CD-ROM Video)

UK Retail CD #2
"Keep Fishin'" (Radio Version)
"Slob" (Live)"
"Knock-Down Drag-Out" (Live)
"Dope Nose" (CD-ROM Video)

UK Retail 7" (Green Vinyl)
"Keep Fishin'" (Radio Version)
"Photograph" (Live)

Notes:The radio/video version of Keep Fishin' is a completely re-recorded version of the song.The Franklin Mint version is an electronic interpretation by drummer Patrick Wilson.The live tracks were recorded in Japan.

Charts

References

External links

Weezer songs
2002 singles
Music videos directed by Marcos Siega
Songs written by Rivers Cuomo
Music videos featuring puppetry
The Muppets